Vikram Udyog Nagari  is an upcoming business district in Ujjain, India. The Government of Madhya Pradesh has allotted 1,200 acres for the development of an industrial area on the Dewas-Ujjain Road near Narwar village. Japan Bank for International Cooperation  and Japan International Cooperation Agency will lend funds for the project.

History 

Originally named "Vikramaditya Knowledge City", the area was envisaged as an educational hub. Due to diminished investment prospects, it was renamed to "Vikram Udyog Nagari" or "Vikram Industrial City".

The stakeholders in the project include the Government of Madhya Pradesh and the Delhi Mumbai Industrial Corridor Trust. The district is projected to have office space, residential areas, facilities for these residential areas educational institutes like Industrial Training Institutes (ITIs), engineering colleges, medical colleges and it will be part of Ujjain Smart City project. This will be first planned city in the state of Madhya Pradesh.

References

External links

Ujjain district
Proposed infrastructure in Madhya Pradesh
Economy of Madhya Pradesh
Memorials to Vikramaditya
Industry in India